Kian, also known as Shahr-e-Kian, is a city in the Central District of Shahrekord County, Chaharmahal and Bakhtiari province, Iran. Previously the city had been called "Sorkhe Laar," later became known as "Shahrak," and in the last few decades called "Kian."

At the 2006 census, its population was 10,922 in 2,645 households. The following census in 2011 counted 12,020 people in 3,402 households. The latest census in 2016 showed a population of 12,948 people in 3,890 households. The city is populated by Turkic people.

Language 
The linguistic composition of the city:

References 

Shahrekord County

Cities in Chaharmahal and Bakhtiari Province

Populated places in Chaharmahal and Bakhtiari Province

Populated places in Shahr-e Kord County

Luri settlements in Chaharmahal and Bakhtiari Province